Balanstra Glacier is the 12 km long and 4 km wide glacier on Brabant Island in the Palmer Archipelago, Antarctica situated northeast of Hippocrates Glacier and southwest of Mackenzie Glacier.  It drains the southeast slopes of Stribog Mountains, flows east-southeastwards and enters Pampa Passage south of Momino Point and north of Pinel Point.

The glacier is named after the ancient Roman station of Balanstra in Western Bulgaria.

Location
British mapping in 1980 and 2008.

Maps
 Antarctic Digital Database (ADD). Scale 1:250000 topographic map of Antarctica. Scientific Committee on Antarctic Research (SCAR). Since 1993, regularly upgraded and updated.
British Antarctic Territory. Scale 1:200000 topographic map. DOS 610 Series, Sheet W 64 62. Directorate of Overseas Surveys, Tolworth, UK, 1980.
Brabant Island to Argentine Islands. Scale 1:250000 topographic map. British Antarctic Survey, 2008.

References
 Bulgarian Antarctic Gazetteer. Antarctic Place-names Commission. (details in Bulgarian, basic data in English)
 Balanstra Glacier. SCAR Composite Antarctic Gazetteer.

External links
 Balanstra Glacier. Copernix satellite image

Glaciers of the Palmer Archipelago
Bulgaria and the Antarctic
Brabant Island